Madagali or Madagli is a town and local government area in Adamawa State, Nigeria, adjacent to the border with Cameroon.

History 

The LGA was created in 1991 when Taraba State was created out of Gongola State. It borders Michika to the south, Askira uba to the west, Gwoza local government area to the north and the Republic of Cameroon to the east.

Ethnic Groups 
The major ethnic tribe in Madagali is the Marghi. Other ethnic tribes of Madagali are Mafa, Sukur, Higgi and Fulani.

Villages 
The major villages in Madagali are Gulak and Shuwa. Madagali is richly blessed with fertile land which makes the people to heavily engage in Agricultural activities.

Boko Haram Insurgency 
In September 2012, a Boko Haram commander was killed in Madgali by Nigerian government forces, and 156 arrests were made as a part of "Operation Restore Sanity."

The town was seized by Boko Haram in August 2014. In September 2014, residents of Madagali, Gulak, and Michika fled to mountainous areas and Mubi town, in the wake of a failed attempt by government troops to re-take the town from the insurgents.

References

Local Government Areas in Adamawa State